Madhampatty Rangaraj is an Indian chef, actor and the CEO of Madhampatty Thangavelu Hospitality Pvt Ltd, which caters in Tamil Nadu and its neighbouring states. He made his acting debut with Mehandi Circus (2019), and later appeared in the thriller film Penguin (2020).

Career

Cooking career 
Rangaraj's passion is animation and studied engineering before working in the food industry for a job. In 2002, he took over his family's businesses along with his brother. Rangaraj moved to Bangalore and started a mess (restaurant). When he returned to Madhampatty, he cooked for small functions. Rangaraj went on to work with film crews and single-handedly providing them with meals. Rangaraj has worked as a caterer for over four-hundred weddings including actor Karthi's wedding. Madhampatty Thangavelu Hospitality has also catered for events including the 2013 Coimbatore Marathon. Rangaraj is credited for creating the recipe for green guava chutney.

Acting career 
Rangaraj made his film debut with the romantic drama Mehandi Circus (2019). In a review of the film by the Deccan Chronicle, the reviewer wrote that "Popular Chef turned hero Madampatti Rangaraj has been aptly cast as the lead protagonist". His next film was the Tamil thriller Penguin (2020). He received the role after the director, Eshvar Karthic, saw Mehandi Circus.<ref name="P">{{Cite web |last=Karthi |first=E. Sudharshan |title=``ஏழே கேரக்டர்ஸ்... கொடைக்கானலில் 32 நாள்... பென்ச்மார்க் கீர்த்தி!’’ - `பெண்குயின்’ அப்டேட்ஸ் |trans-title=`` Seven Characters ... 32 Days in Kodaikanal ... Benchmark Keerthi!  - `Penguin 'Updates |url=https://cinema.vikatan.com/tamil-cinema/madhampatty-rangaraj-shares-about-his-experience-in-penguin-movie |url-status=live |archive-url=https://web.archive.org/web/20200610003952/https://cinema.vikatan.com/tamil-cinema/madhampatty-rangaraj-shares-about-his-experience-in-penguin-movie |archive-date=10 June 2020 |access-date=10 June 2020 |website=Ananda Vikatan |language=ta}}</ref> Rangaraj later signed on to appear in Casino, the directorial debut of Mark Joel which began filming in November 2020.

 Filmography All films are in Tamil, unless otherwise noted.''

References

External links 

TED talk

Actors in Tamil cinema
Chefs of Indian cuisine
Indian chefs
Living people
People from Tamil Nadu
Year of birth missing (living people)